Nom Du Jeu is a New Zealand thoroughbred racehorse. He won the 2008 AJC Australian Derby, beating Red Ruler in a rare New Zealand quinella in an Australian Group One race. The win made him the first New Zealand male three-year-old to win an Australian Group One since Our Maizcay in the 1995 Caulfield Guineas, and the first New Zealander to win a Group One in Sydney since Honor Babe in the 2003 Sydney Cup.

Nom Du Jeu continued this form as a four-year-old. A first-up win (which was later taken off him after a positive swab) was followed by placings in the  Stoney Bridge Stakes and  Kelt Capital Stakes. He then travelled to Australia, where he finished second in the Caulfield Cup and eighth in the Melbourne Cup. He was retired after competing in the 2009  W. S. Cox Plate.

As of 2017, Nom Du Jeu stands at Raheen Stud in Queensland, where he has sired 43 winners from 105 runners

See also

 Thoroughbred racing in New Zealand
 Thoroughbred racing in Australia

References

1990 racehorse births
Racehorses bred in New Zealand
Racehorses trained in New Zealand
Racehorses trained in Australia
Thoroughbred family 5